Dmitry Kokarev may refer to:
 Dmitry Kokarev (chess player) (born 1982),  Russian chess Grandmaster
 Dmitrii Kokarev (born 1991), Russian swimmer

See also
Kokarev